Ernest Muir may refer to:

 Ernest Muir (b. 1880), a Scottish physician who studied leprosy
 Ernest Roger Muir (19182008), a Canadian-American television producer
 Richard Ernest Muir (b. 1943), a British landscape historian and author